La Comercial is a barrio (neighbourhood or district) of Montevideo, Uruguay.

Location
It borders Villa Muñoz to the west, La Figurita and Jacinto Vera to the north, Larrañaga and Tres Cruces to the east and Tres Cruces and Cordón to the south.

Places of worship
 Parish Church of Our Lady of Bzommar (Roman Catholic)
 Church of Our Lady of Luján, known also as "San Expedito" (Roman Catholic)

See also 
Barrios of Montevideo

External links 

 Official site / Historia del barrio La Comercial

Barrios of Montevideo